Thomas Banks Strong  (24 October 1861 – 8 July 1944) was an English Anglican bishop and theologian. He served as Bishop of Ripon and Oxford. He was also Dean of Christ Church, Oxford and served as Vice-Chancellor of Oxford University during the First World War.

Thomas Strong was educated at Westminster School and Christ Church, Oxford, where he received a second-class degree in Literae Humaniores in 1883. He became a deacon in 1885 and a priest in 1886. At Christ Church, Strong was successively Lecturer (1884), Student (1888), Censor (1892), and then Dean (1901–1920). He received the degree Doctor of Divinity (DD) from the University of Oxford in January 1902.

In 1920 he was appointed Bishop of Ripon, and in 1925 was translated as Bishop of Oxford, serving as such, and as Clerk of the Closet and Chancellor of the Order of the Garter until 1937.

Strong produced a number of theological publications.

He became a Knight Grand Cross of the Order of the British Empire (GBE) in 1918.
He was buried at Christ Church Cathedral, Oxford, where there is a memorial stone with a Latin inscription.

Selected books
 Christian Ethics: Eight Lectures (Longmans, Green and Co., 1896)
 A Manual of Theology (1903)
 God and the Individual (1903; Kessinger Publishing Company, 2008)
 Lectures on the Method of Science (Oxford: Clarendon Press, 1906)
 Visitation Charge of the Bishop of Oxford at the Diocesan Visitation 1931 (Oxford University Press, 1931)

References

External links

 
 Bibliographic directory from Project Canterbury
 Strong, Thomas Banks (1861–1944) Bishop of Oxford letters, JANUS, University of Cambridge
 
 Pictures and photographs at the National Portrait Gallery (London)
 

1861 births
1944 deaths
People educated at Westminster School, London
Alumni of Christ Church, Oxford
Fellows of Christ Church, Oxford
Doctors of Divinity
English theologians
Anglo-Catholic bishops
British Anglo-Catholics
19th-century English Anglican priests
20th-century English Anglican priests
Bishops of Ripon (modern diocese)
Bishops of Oxford
Clerks of the Closet
Chancellors of the Order of the Garter
Deans of Christ Church, Oxford
Vice-Chancellors of the University of Oxford
Knights Grand Cross of the Order of the British Empire
Burials at Christ Church Cathedral, Oxford